Ȥ (minuscule: ȥ, Unicode codepoints U+0224 and U+0225, respectively), a Latin letter Z with a hook.

The Unicode standard notes "Middle High German" for the application of the grapheme, intended to represent the coronal fricative  also transcribed as tailed z .

See also
Middle High German
High German consonant shift
Middle High German literature
Ʒ (ezh)
ɀ (z with swash tail)
Ⱬ (z with descender)

Latin letters with diacritics